Italy has participated in all 36 editions of the LEN European Aquatics Championships, since the first edition Budapest 1926 to Rome 2022.

Medals by disciplines
Are excluded European Open Water Swimming Championships stand alone (7 editions from 1989 to 2016 was discontinued), the European Water Polo Championship stand alone tournament (12 editions from 1999 to 2022) and the European Diving Championships stand alone (6 editions from 2009 to 2019).

Swimming

note 1: in italic to update.
note 2: Where it is reported half medal refers to those assigned in mixed relays from 2014 for the first time.

Multiple medalists
Relays are included, open water is not included.

Diving
Diving was an integral part of the European Aquatics Championships since its introduction in 1926. But also a separate European Diving Championships were first held in 2009 in Turin, the competition is biennial and 6 editions was held from 2009 to 2019.

Open water swimming
European Open Water Swimming Championships was seven-time stand alone championship (1989, 1991, 1993, 2008, 2011, 2012, 2016) and eleven-time part of the European Aquatics Championships (1995, 1997, 1999, 2000, 2002, 2004, 2006, 2010, 2014, 2018, 2022).

Artistic swimming
Formerly known as Synchronized swimming, is part of the program of the European Aquatics Championships from 1974.

Water polo
The first European Water Polo Championship was held in 1926 in Budapest, Hungary, with just a men's competition. The women for the first time competed in 1985 (Oslo, Norway) for the European title. The water polo tournament was part of the European Aquatics Championships up to and including 1997, and from 1999 the event was separated and got its own independent tournament.

See also
 Italy national swimming team
 Italy national diving team
 Italy at the World Aquatics Championships
 European Aquatics Championships all-time medal table

Notes

References

External links
 Official site of the Italian Swimming Federation  
  Official site of the LEN

Nations at the European Aquatics Championships
European Aquatics Championships
European Aquatics Championships